Acacesia hamata is a species of spider in the orb weaver family, Araneidae. It is typically found in summer months of the eastern half of the United States, south to Argentina. Acacesia hamata is the only species of Acacesia normally found in the United States.

References

Spiders of North America
Araneidae
Spiders described in 1847